Kirklington Hall Research Station was a geophysical research institute of BP in Kirklington, Nottinghamshire. During the 1950s it was the main research site of British Petroleum.

History
As part of the East Midlands Oil Province, oil was found in eastern Nottinghamshire. It was also known as the BP Research Centre or the Geophysical Centre, part of BP's Exploration Division. The research centre was established in 1950. Its first employee was Jack Birks, later Managing Director of BP. From 1950 it was the main research site of BP, until BP sold the site in 1957 for £12,000. Research moved to Sunbury-on-Thames, in Surrey, in 1957. Sunbury had been built around the same time as the Kirklington site, in the early 1950s.

Kirklington Hall today is a private school.

Structure
The former site is situated north of the A617.

Function
It conducted geophysical research for exploration for BP. This part of BP is now known as BP Exploration. Work would be conducted on core samples and with seismic methods.

See also
 British Geological Survey, also in Nottinghamshire
 Sunbury Research Centre, where most of BP's research takes place in the UK today.
 :Category:Petroleum geology
 :Category:Seismology measurement

References

 British Petroleum and Global Oil 1950-1975: The Challenge of Nationalism, James Bamberg, page 33

External links
 Our Nottinghamshire

1950 establishments in England
1957 disestablishments in England
BP buildings and structures
Buildings and structures in Nottinghamshire
Energy research institutes
Engineering research institutes
Earth science research institutes
Petroleum industry in the United Kingdom
Petroleum organizations
Research institutes established in 1950
Research institutes in England
Science and technology in Nottinghamshire
Research stations